Josef Kos (18 July 1892 – 28 January 1961) was a Czech gymnast. He competed in four events at the 1924 Summer Olympics.

References

1892 births
1961 deaths
Czech male artistic gymnasts
Olympic gymnasts of Czechoslovakia
Gymnasts at the 1924 Summer Olympics
Sportspeople from Hradec Králové